Roberto Carlos Castro Mora (born March 7, 1980 in León, Guanajuato), known as Roberto Castro, is a Mexican football manager and former player.

External links
 

1980 births
Living people
Sportspeople from León, Guanajuato
Mexican footballers
Atlas F.C. footballers
Liga MX players
Mexican football managers

Association footballers not categorized by position